Horsfieldia palauensis is a species of plant in the family Myristicaceae. It is endemic to Palau.

References

palauensis
Endemic flora of Palau
Trees of Oceania
Near threatened plants
Near threatened biota of Oceania
Taxonomy articles created by Polbot